The  is a commuter electric multiple unit (EMU) train type introduced by Central Japan Railway Company (JR Central) in the Nagoya and Shizuoka areas on 5 March 2022.

Fleet details
The fleet will ultimately consist of 42 four-car sets and 23 eight-car sets. The eight-car sets are numbered from C1 onwards while the four-car sets are numbered from C101 onwards.

Formations
Eight-car sets are formed as follows.

Interior
The design concept of the interior is "a comfortable moving space with a gentle and secure feeling."

Wheelchair spaces are provided in every car. Also featured are LCD passenger information displays and security cameras. Priority seating areas use a different floor design and color scheme to distinguish them from general-use seating.

History
JR Central has ordered 352 cars as a replacement for the 211, 213, and 311 series trains operating since the late 1980s. The fleet was first introduced into service on 5 March 2022, with eight-car sets C2 and C6 being the first to enter service.

Sets from C8 onwards are designated for fleet expansion. This set also has modified cowcatchers at the end cars compared to the previous existing 8-car sets (of which there are seven).

The four-car sets began appearing in December 2022.

References

Electric multiple units of Japan
Nippon Sharyo multiple units
Central Japan Railway Company
1500 V DC multiple units of Japan